{{Infobox person
| name = Catelynn Baltierra
| image =
| birth_name = Catelynn Lowell
| birth_date = 
| birth_place = Port Huron, Michigan
| occupation = |
| years_active = 2009-present
| television = {{plainlist|
16 and Pregnant
Teen Mom OG
Couples Therapy (Season 3)Reunited }}|
| spouse = 
| children = 4
}}
Catelynn Baltierra (née Lowell; born March 12, 1992) is an American reality television personality, author, and public speaker. From Algonac, Michigan, she received public attention after being cast in the reality television series 16 and Pregnant in 2009, which documented the pregnancies and first months of motherhood for several young women. Later that year she was cast in the spin-off series Teen Mom, and appeared in each of its four seasons until its conclusion in 2012. In March 2015, Lowell returned to MTV for the fifth season of the show, renamed Teen Mom OG. Baltierra and now-husband Tyler also appeared on Season 3 of TV Show Couples Therapy.

Lowell and Baltierra released their first book, Conquering Chaos in March, 2015. In December 2016, the couple's show Reunited'' aired on MTV, helping people who had been adopted reunite with their birth families; it was cancelled after just one airing.

Personal life 
Catelynn Lowell was born in Port Huron, Michigan, on March 12, 1992, to parents April Brockmiller and David Lowell.

Lowell became pregnant with her first child with boyfriend, Tyler Baltierra, and gave birth to a baby girl on May 18, 2009, named Carolyn "Carly" Elizabeth Davis by her adoptive parents, Brandon and Teresa.

On August 22, 2015, Tyler and Catelynn married. They have since had three daughters: Novalee Reign (b. 2015), Vaeda Luma (b. 2019) and Rya Rose (b. 2021).

On November 17, 2017, Lowell took to social media to tell fans she was seeking treatment after experiencing suicidal thoughts. Following a miscarriage, Lowell returned to treatment for a third time in January 2018, citing childhood trauma as one of the causes of her mental health issues after speculation by fans on Twitter.

References

Living people
MTV
Teenage pregnancy in television
21st-century American writers
Participants in American reality television series
1992 births